Douglas Woolley Parker (April 24, 1895 – May 15, 1972) was a catcher in Major League Baseball who played for the Philadelphia Phillies during the 1923 season. Listed at 5' 11", Weight: 160 lb., Parker batted and threw right handed. He was born in Forest Home, Alabama.

Parker  played briefly for the 1923 Phillies, forming part of a catcher tandem that included Butch Henline, Dink O'Brien and Jimmy Wilson.

He also spent parts of 16 minor league seasons spanning 1918–1941, while playing or managing for 17 teams in 13 different leagues.

Parker died in Tuscaloosa, Alabama, at the age of 77.

External links

1895 births
1972 deaths
Major League Baseball catchers
Philadelphia Phillies players
Minor league baseball managers
Americus Cardinals players
Augusta Tigers players
Bradenton Growers players
Burlington Bees players
Columbia Senators players
Davenport Blue Sox players
Denver Bears players
Fieldale Towlers players
Kingsport Cherokees players
Muskogee Athletics players
New Orleans Pelicans (baseball) players
Oklahoma City Indians players
Petersburg Goobers players
Portsmouth Truckers players
Seattle Indians players
South Boston Wrappers players
Williamston Martins players
Baseball players from Alabama
People from Butler County, Alabama